The South Persia Brigade was a brigade of the British Indian Army formed in 1915, for service in south Persia and the Persian Gulf as part of the Persian Campaign.

References

Bibliography

Brigades of India in World War I
Military units and formations established in 1903